In molecular biology, ST7 antisense RNA 1 (non-protein coding), also known as ST7-AS1 is a long non-coding RNA. In humans, it is found on chromosome 7 in a locus spanning a translocation breakpoint associated with autism. It is antisense to the ST7 gene.

See also
 Long noncoding RNA

References

Non-coding RNA